Vasily Alexandrovich Starodubtsev (December 25, 1931 in Volovchik village, Central Black Earth Oblast, now Lipetsk Oblast – December 30, 2011 in Novomoskovsk, Tula Oblast) was a Soviet and Russian politician and governor of Tula Oblast from 1997 to 2005.  He was also the Chairman of the Peasants Union of the USSR, during which he served as a member of the State Committee on the State of Emergency in the 1991 Soviet coup d'état attempt. He was a leader of the Agrarian Party of Russia.

Biography
Starodubtsev graduated from Voronezh Agricultural Institute and All-USSR Correspondence Agricultural Institute. For many years he was a chairman of kolkhoz in Novomoskovsk district. Among his awards were Hero of Socialist Labour title, three Orders of Lenin, USSR State Prize, Order of the October Revolution, Order of the Badge of Honour. He had Candidate of Sciences degree in agriculture and was a corresponding member of VASKhNIL.

Starodubtsev was a member of the Federation Council of Russia (1993–96; also in 1997–2001 as a region governor) and of the State Duma (2007–11).

Starodubtsev was a member of the Communist Party of the Russian Federation.

References

External links

1931 births
2011 deaths
People from Lipetsk Oblast
Expelled members of the Communist Party of the Soviet Union
Soviet politicians
Governors of Tula Oblast
Communist Party of the Russian Federation members
Members of the Federation Council of Russia (1994–1996)
Members of the Federation Council of Russia (1996–2000)
State Committee on the State of Emergency members
Heroes of Socialist Labour
Recipients of the Order of Lenin
Recipients of the USSR State Prize
VASKhNIL
Fifth convocation members of the State Duma (Russian Federation)
Sixth convocation members of the State Duma (Russian Federation)